Rudolf Vrána (14 July 1910 – 27 February 1983) was a Czech skier. He competed in the Nordic combined event at the 1936 Winter Olympics.

References

External links
 

1910 births
1983 deaths
Czech male Nordic combined skiers
Olympic Nordic combined skiers of Czechoslovakia
Nordic combined skiers at the 1936 Winter Olympics
Place of birth missing